Slade Norris (born October 25, 1985) is a former American football linebacker. He played college football at Oregon State. He was drafted by the Oakland Raiders in the fourth round of the 2009 NFL Draft.

Norris was also a member of the Seattle Seahawks and Jacksonville Jaguars.

Professional career

Oakland Raiders
Norris was drafted by the Oakland Raiders in the fourth round of the 2009 NFL Draft. He was released at the end of the 2009 training camp but was later re-signed to their practice squad. Norris was promoted to the active roster in November 2009. On December 30, he was placed on injured reserve due to a hamstring injury. He was released from the practice squad by the Raiders on September 23, 2010.

Jacksonville Jaguars
Norris was signed to the Jacksonville Jaguars practice squad on November 10, 2010. He was waived by the Jaguars on August 25, 2011.

Personal life
Norris currently resides in Dallas, Texas.

External links
Oakland Raiders bio 
Oregon State Beavers bio

1985 births
Living people
Players of American football from Portland, Oregon
American football linebackers
American football defensive ends
Oregon State Beavers football players
Oakland Raiders players
Seattle Seahawks players
Jacksonville Jaguars players
Detroit Lions players
Jesuit High School (Beaverton, Oregon) alumni
Sportspeople from Vancouver, Washington